Tibetan calligraphy refers to the calligraphic traditions used to write the Tibetan language. As in other parts of East Asia, nobles, high lamas, and persons of high rank were expected to have high abilities in calligraphy. However, unlike other East Asian calligraphic traditions, calligraphy was done using a reed pen as opposed to a brush. Tibetan calligraphy is at times more free-flowing than calligraphy involving the descendants of other Brahmi scripts. Given the overriding religious nature of Tibetan culture, many of the traditions in calligraphy come from religious texts, and most Tibetan scribes have a monastic background.

Styles

A variety of different styles of calligraphy exist in Tibet:

 The Uchen ("headed"; also transliterated as uchan or dbu-can) style of the Tibetan script is marked by heavy horizontal lines and tapering vertical lines, and is the most common script for writing in the Tibetan language, and also appears in printed form because of its exceptional clarity. It is believe to have been carved on wooden slabs. The Uchen system was developed in the 9th century by scholar Khyungpo Yutri. The Clear, Precious Box (Yi-ge'i thig-ris gsal-ba'i rin-chen sgrom-bu) written by Yutri's student, Rongpo, was a handwriting manual of the Uchen style. Desi Sangye Gyatso would later write a commentary on The Clear, Precious Box, which established the basis of the use of Uchen script. Uchen was designed as a formal script used by scholars and members of educated society to record important documents.
 Ngatar development
 Toad - the initial Thonmi Sambhota edition
 Qitar development
 Sarqung or chung (standard ujain)
 Sugring
 Sugtung
 Sarqên
 The Umê ("headless"; or ume) style is a more cursive script which can be seen in daily correspondence and in other day-to-day life.  The feature which distinguishes it the most from u-chan is the lack of the horizontal lines on the top of letters.
 The bêtsug (or betsu) style is a narrow, cursive variant of umê in squarish shape.
 The dru-tsa (or drutsa) style is a variant of umê but with ujain vowel symbol.
 curve-leg zhuza
 straight-leg zhuza
 short-leg zhuza
 The tsugtung (or tsugtung) style is shortened, abbreviated variant of u-me, traditionally used for commentaries.
 The tsugring style
 The kyug-yig ("fast letters"; or chuyig) is a highly abbreviated, fluid, cursive version of u-me.  It is a common form of handwriting for notes and personal letters.
 general cursive
 extremely cursive
 The tsug-ma-kyug yig style — a style halfway between cug'yig and kyug'yig
 The gyug-yig style

Other related styles
The vertical Phags-pa script is known as horyig ( hor-yig, "Mongolian letters").  A more ornamental version of the horyig style was used in the past to make personal seals. It is often found written vertically as opposed to horizontally.

These styles are not fixed, and are not limited to those listed above. By mixing features of various styles, and adding various ornaments to the text, the number of styles becomes quite large. While ujain may be used to write entire Sutras or Buddhist texts, the rest of the styles are more frequently used to write a single phrase or saying.

Notable examples
The world record for the longest calligraphy scroll is held by Jamyang Dorjee Chakrishar, who penned a 163.2 meter scroll containing 65,000 Tibetan characters. The scroll contains prayers for the 14th Dalai Lama composed by 32 different monks.

See also
 Tibetan script
 Tibetan typefaces
 Tibetan literature

References

External links
 Tibetan calligraphy dedicated to tattoos designs
 An exhibition of Tibetan Calligraphy by Jamyang Dorjee Chakrishar
 Interview with Tsering Phuntsok, a Tibetan calligrapher living in Germany.
 Andrew West, Phags-pa script
 Tibetan writing styles
 Exquisite Example of Tibetan Calligraphy by His Holiness The XVII Karmapa
 An exhibition of Tibetan Calligraphy by P. N. Dhumkhang
 Tibetan calligrapher - Tashi Mannox
 Tibetan calligraphy tattoo template designs
 Tibetan calligrapher - Karma Samdrup Targye

East Asian calligraphy
Tibetan script
Tibetan painting